The Pakistani audio leaks controversy stems from several leaked audio conversations involving Pakistan's prime minister Shehbaz Sharif and former prime minister Imran Khan among others. The leaks began on 24 September 2022, when multiple audio files of purported conversations, allegedly recorded in the Prime Minister's Office, surfaced online. On 28 September 2022, a National Security Committee (NSC) meeting was convened to discuss matters related to national security, including the audio leaks.

References

2022 in Pakistani politics
September 2022 events in Pakistan